Akhunovo (Axun) is a rural locality (a village) in Troitsky Selsoviet, Blagovarsky District, Bashkortostan, Russia. The population was 214 as of 2010. There are 6 streets.

Geography 
Akhunovo is located 37 km northwest of Yazykovo (the district's administrative centre) by road. Kilimovo is the nearest rural locality.

References 

Rural localities in Blagovarsky District